Kracht is surname of:
 Christian Kracht (born 1966), a Swiss novelist and journalist
 Felix Kracht (1912, Krefeld – 2002), a German engineer
 Marion Kracht (born 1962, Munich), a German television actress
 Torsten Kracht (born 1967), an East German-German football player 
 Lewis Kracht (born 1867), a Swiss naturalist and dog-breeder

See also 
 Kracht's theorem (Kracht formula)
 Kracht (film), a 1990 Dutch drama film directed by Frouke Fokkema
 Geeft ons kracht, a 1920 Dutch silent film directed by Theo Frenkel

References 

Dutch words and phrases
Low German surnames
Dutch-language surnames
German-language surnames
Patronymic surnames

nl:Kracht